Leonidas John Guibas is the Paul Pigott Professor of Computer Science and Electrical Engineering at Stanford University. He heads the Geometric Computation group in the Computer Science Department.

Guibas obtained his Ph.D. from Stanford University in 1976. That same year, he was program chair for the ACM Symposium on Computational Geometry in 1996. In 2017 he was elected to the National Academy of Engineering. Guibas is a Fellow of the ACM and the IEEE, and was awarded the ACM - AAAI Allen Newell Award for 2007 "for his pioneering contributions in applying algorithms to a wide range of computer science disciplines." In 2018 he was elected to the American Academy of Arts and Sciences. In 2022 he was elected to the National Academy of Sciences.

Research
The research contributions Guibas is known for include finger trees, red–black trees, fractional cascading, the Guibas–Stolfi algorithm for Delaunay triangulation, an optimal data structure for point location, the quad-edge data structure for representing planar subdivisions, Metropolis light transport, and kinetic data structures for keeping track of objects in motion. More recently, he has focused on shape analysis and computer vision using deep neural networks. He has Erdős number 2 due to his collaborations with Boris Aronov, Andrew Odlyzko, János Pach, Richard M. Pollack, Endre Szemerédi, and Frances Yao.

References

External links
Guibas laboratory
Detection of Symmetries and Repeated Patterns in 3D Point Cloud Data, videolecture by Guibas

Year of birth missing (living people)
Living people
Stanford University alumni
Stanford University School of Engineering faculty
Stanford University Department of Computer Science faculty
Researchers in geometric algorithms
Greek computer scientists
American computer scientists
Fellows of the Association for Computing Machinery
Fellow Members of the IEEE
Members of the United States National Academy of Engineering
Members of the United States National Academy of Sciences